Khorramdasht is a village in Lay Siyah Rural District, in the Central District of Nain County, Isfahan Province, Iran. At the 2006 census, its population was 75.

References 

Populated places in Nain County